It is estimated that the city of Lahore, Pakistan, has a Muslim majority with 94.7% and Christian minority constitute 5.1% of the population and rest Sikhs and Hindus constitute the remaining 0.2%. There is also a small but longstanding Zoroastrian community.

Before Partition 

Prior to the partition of India in 1947, a third of Lahore district's population was Hindu and Sikh. Hindus and Sikhs used to reside in 'distinct enclaves'. The city's Hindu and Sikh population left en masse during the partition and shifted to East Punjab and Delhi in India. In the process, Lahore lost its entire Hindu and Sikh population. The emigrants were replaced by Muslim refugees from India. Muslim refugees and locals competed for ownership over abandoned Hindu and Sikh property.

Religious heritage 
According to a Hindu legend, Lahore was once named Lavapura, after Lava, son of Lord Rama, Hindu God from Ramayana as one of etymological theory of Lahore. A vacant temple, the Lava Temple, dedicated to this figure is contained inside the Lahore Fort.

The first Persian text on Sufism was written, by Shaykh Abul Hasan 'Ali Hujwiri, in Lahore which became a major source for early Sufi thought and practice. Hujwiri's tomb in Lahore is one of the major Sufi shrines in the subcontinent. Several other leading Sufi saints are buried in Lahore. These Sufi shrines have contributed to making Lahore an important place of pilgrimage. During the Mughal era, several impressive buildings including mosques were constructed, contributing to the city's rich Mughal heritage.

The city is also of significant importance to the Sikhs of Punjab region who call it Lahore-Sharif. Some of Sikhism's holiest sites are situated inside Lahore.

Gallery

Notes

References